Mountain View may refer to the following unincorporated communities in West Virginia, United States:

 Mountain View, Logan County, West Virginia
 Mountain View (north), Preston County, West Virginia
 Mountain View (south), Preston County, West Virginia